Cinnarizine/dimenhydrinate, sold under the brand name Cizinate among others is a fixed-dose combination medication for the treatment of vertigo in adults. It contains cinnarizine and dimenhydrinate. It is taken by mouth.

It was approved for medical use in Australia in December 2018.

References

Further reading

External links 
 
 

Combination drugs